John Augustus "Josh" Billings (November 30, 1891 – December 30, 1981) was a backup catcher in Major League Baseball who played for three different teams between the  and  seasons. He was born in Grantville, Kansas.

Before playing professional baseball, Billings was a star player at Kansas State University (1910) and Oklahoma State University (1911–12).

Billings played from 1913 to 1918 for the Cleveland Naps (renamed the Indians in 1915). In 1919, he was traded to the St. Louis Browns in exchange for Les Nunamaker. In St. Louis he received considerably more playing time than he had in Cleveland. His most productive season came in 1920, when he posted career-numbers in batting average (.277), runs (19) and RBI (11), while matching a career-high 66 games played and finishing seventh in the American League in hit by pitches (7). He was a career .217 hitter in 243 games.

In 1943 Billings managed the Kenosha Comets, one of the four original teams of the All-American Girls Professional Baseball League, and led his team to the playoffs in that season.

Billings died in Santa Monica, California, at the age of 90.

References 

Major League Baseball catchers
Cleveland Indians players
Cleveland Naps players
St. Louis Browns players
Kansas State Wildcats baseball players
Oklahoma State Cowboys baseball players
All-American Girls Professional Baseball League managers
Baseball players from Kansas
People from Jefferson County, Kansas
1890s births
1981 deaths
Minor league baseball managers
Manhattan Elks players
Topeka Jayhawks players
Quincy Gems players
Cleveland Bearcats players
Cleveland Spiders (minor league) players
Los Angeles Angels (minor league) players
Kansas City Blues (baseball) players
Dallas Steers players
Alexandria Reds players
Monroe Twins players
Vicksburg Hill Billies players
Baton Rouge Senators players
Baton Rouge Solons players
Baton Rouge Red Sticks players
Clarksdale Ginners players
Lake Charles Skippers players